Royal Air Force Meir or more simply RAF Meir is a former Royal Air Force station located in Stoke-on-Trent, Staffordshire, England.

The following units were here at some point:
 No. 1 Practice Flying Unit was formed here on 4 March 1940 and operated Hawker Hectors and Hawker Hinds until it was disbanded on 16 June 1940
 No. 5 Elementary Flying Training School RAF
 No. 16 Elementary Flying Training School RAF
 No. 28 Elementary and Reserve Flying Training School RAF
 No. 45 Gliding School RAF
 No. 632 Gliding School RAF

References

Citations

Bibliography

Meir